The Ateltem is a river of central Papua, in western central Papua New Guinea near the border with Indonesia.

References

Rivers of Papua New Guinea
Sandaun Province